MBP or mbp may refer to:

Science and technology
 Münchausen syndrome by proxy, a disorder wherein a caregiver acts as if their patient has health problems
 MacBook Pro, a line of Macintosh portable computers by Apple Inc.
 Modbus Plus, an extended version of the Modbus serial communications protocol published by Modicon in 1979

Biology
 Mega base pairs (Mbp)
 Major basic protein, a protein which in humans is encoded by the PRG2 gene
 Maltose-binding protein, a part of the maltose/maltodextrin system of Escherichia coli
 4-Methyl-2,4-bis(4-hydroxyphenyl)pent-1-ene, a metabolite of bisphenol A
 Milk basic protein, a milk protein fraction
 Myc-binding protein-1, a protein encoded by the alpha-enolase glycolytic enzyme
 Myelin basic protein, a protein believed to be important in the process of myelination of nerves in the central nervous system
 Mannan-binding lectin (also mannose- or mannan-binding protein), an important factor in innate immunity

Media
 "ManBearPig", the sixth episode of the tenth season of Comedy Central's South Park
 Million Book Project, a book digitization project, led by Carnegie Mellon University
 Murder by Pride, the eighth studio album by Stryper

Organisations
 McDonough Bolyard Peck, an American construction management company
 Marquette Branch Prison, a prison in Michigan, US
 Ministry of Public Security (Poland) (Polish: Ministerstwo Bezpieczeństwa Publicznego) 1945-1954

Other uses
 Wiwa language (ISO 639 code: mbp), a Chibchan language

See also
 Megabit per second (Mbps or Mbit/s), a data rate unit
 Megabyte per second (MBps or MB/s), a data rate unit
 MBPS (Member British Psychological Society)